The men's 4 x 400 metres relay event at the 1994 European Athletics Championships was held in Helsinki, Finland, at Helsinki Olympic Stadium on 14 August 1994.

Medalists

Results

Final
14 August

Participation
According to an unofficial count, 28 athletes from 7 countries participated in the event.

 (4)
 (4)
 (4)
 (4)
 (4)
 (4)
 (4)

References

4 x 400 metres relay
4 x 400 metres relay at the European Athletics Championships